In knot theory, a Lissajous-toric knot is a knot defined by parametric equations of the form

,

For  the knot is a torus knot.

Braid and billiard knot definitions 

In braid form these knots can be defined in a square solid torus (i.e. the cube  with identified top and bottom) as

.

The projection of this Lissajous-toric knot onto the x-y-plane is a Lissajous curve.

Replacing the sine and cosine functions in the parametrization by a triangle wave transforms a Lissajous-toric
knot isotopically into a billiard curve inside the solid torus. Because of this property Lissajous-toric knots are also called billiard knots in a solid torus.

Lissajous-toric knots were first studied as billiard knots and they share many properties with billiard knots in a cylinder.
They also occur in the analysis of singularities of minimal surfaces with branch points and in the study of 
the Three-body problem.

Properties 

To ensure that the knot is traversed only once in the parametrization 
the conditions  are needed. In addition, singular values for the phase, leading to self-intersections, have to be excluded.

The isotopy class of Lissajous-toric knots surprisingly does not depend on the phase  (up to mirroring). 
If the distinction between a knot and its mirror image is not important, the notation  can be used.

The main properties are:
 Interchanging  and :
 (up to mirroring).
 Ribbon property:
 Periodicity: 
If , the Lissajous-toric knot has period  and the factor knot is a ribbon knot.
 Strongly-plus-amphicheirality:
If  and  have different parity, then  is strongly-plus-amphicheiral.
 Period 2: 

Example 
The knot T(3,8,7), shown in the graphics, is a symmetric union and a ribbon knot (in fact, it is the composite knot  ).
It is strongly-plus-amphicheiral: a rotation by  maps the knot to its mirror image, keeping its orientation.
An additional horizontal symmetry occurs as a combination of the vertical symmetry and the rotation (′double palindromicity′ in Kin/Nakamura/Ogawa).

′Classification′ of billiard rooms 
In the following table a systematic overview of the possibilities to build billiard rooms from the interval and the circle (interval with identified boundaries) is given:

In the case of Lissajous knots reflections at the boundaries occur in all of the three cube's dimensions. 
In the second case reflections occur in two dimensions and we have a uniform movement in the third dimension.
The third case is nearly equal to the usual movement on a torus, with an additional triangle wave movement in the first dimension.

References 

Knots (knot theory)